Omar Al-Zayni (born 20 January 1996) is a Saudi Arabian professional footballer who plays as a midfielder for Jeddah.

Career
Al-Zayni began his career at the youth team of Al-Ahli. On 25 August 2018, Al-Zayni joined MS League side Hajer. In early 2018, Al-Zayni joined Saudi Third Division side Al-Entesar. In 2018, Al-Zayni returned to Al Al-Ahli with a new contract. On 1 September 2019, Al-Zayni joined MS League side Al-Qadsiah from Al-Ahli. On 24 August 2022, Al-Zayni joined Jeddah.

References

External links
 

1996 births
Living people
People from Jeddah
Association football midfielders
Saudi Arabian footballers
Saudi Fourth Division players
Saudi First Division League players
Saudi Professional League players
Al-Ahli Saudi FC players
Hajer FC players
Al-Entesar Club players
Ohod Club players
Al-Qadsiah FC players
Jeddah Club players